Lemalesomab is a mouse monoclonal antibody for the diagnosis of inflammatory lesions.

References

Monoclonal antibodies